The International Secretariat of the Masonic Adogmatic Powers (ISMAP) (French: Secrétariat international Maçonnique des Puissances Adogmatiques (SIMPA)) was an international organization of Masonic jurisdictions of masonic lodges. The jurisdictions involved are considered irregular by the United Grand Lodge of England (UGLE) and most other Anglo-Saxon Grand Lodges, because they accept women, or do not require Masons to have a belief in a Supreme Being. Its members merged back into CLIPSAS in the early 2010s.

History
The organization was founded on December 26, 1998 in Brussels, Belgium.  The organization was founded after the Grand Orient de France and the Grand Orient of Belgium left CLIPSAS.

Membership
SIMPA members as of 2000:
Europe & Asia (17):
 Grand Orient de Belgique
 Grande Loge de Belgique
 Grande Loge Féminine de Belgique
 Grand Orient de France
 Grande Loge de Memphis-Misraïm (France)
 Grande Loge Féminine de Memphis-Misraïm (France)
 Grande Loge Mixte Universelle (France)
 Fédération française du Droit Humain (France)
 Sérénissime Grand Orient de Grèce
 Grand Orient de Hongrie
 Gran Loggia d’Italia ALAM
 Grand Orient de Luxembourg
 Grand Orient de Pologne (Poland)
 Gran Logia Simbolica Española
 Grand Orient de Suisse
 Grande Loge Féminine de Suisse
 Grande Loge Maçonnique de Turquie

Americas:
 George Washington Union (USA)
 Supreme Council of Ancient Kemetic Moorish Rite (USA & Morocco)
 Grande Loja Unida de São Paulo (Brazil)
 Grande Oriente de Santa Catarina (Brazil)

See also
 Grande Loge Nationale Française
 International Masonic Union Catena

References

Co-Freemasonry
Masonic organizations